Naria thomasi is a species of sea snail, a cowry, a marine gastropod mollusk in the family Cypraeidae, the cowries.

Description
The shell size varies between 10 mm and 24 mm.

Distribution
This species occurs in the Red Sea, in the Indian Ocean along Eritrea and Somalia and in the Pacific along the Marquesas.

References

 Burgess, C.M. (1970). The Living Cowries. AS Barnes and Co, Ltd. Cranbury, New Jersey
 Poppe G. (1993) Una nuova Ciprea / A new cowrie. La Conchiglia 267: 32–35.
 Lorenz, F. (2017). Cowries. A guide to the gastropod family Cypraeidae. Volume 1, Biology and systematics. Harxheim: ConchBooks. 644 pp.

External links
 Crosse H. (1865). Diagnoses molluscorum novorum. Journal de Conchyliologie. 13(1): 55-57
 Gastropods.com : Naria thomasi : photos

Cypraeidae
Gastropods described in 1865